This article provides details of international football games played by the Hong Kong national football team from 2020 to present.

Results

2021

2022

References

Football in Hong Kong
2020
2020s in Hong Kong sport